Metromare is a trolleybus rapid transit line connecting the central railway station of Rimini and the nearby seaside resort of Riccione, and is part of the Rimini trolleybus system. It opened on November 23, 2019, temporarily operated by motorbuses until the fleet of new trolleybuses ordered specifically for the Metromare had been certified for use, and was converted to trolleybuses on October 28, 2021.
It is operated by START Romagna.

History

The residents of Rimini and Riccione, alongside the tourists visiting the local coastal areas every year, complained about the high traffic congestion of Viale Regina Elena, the main seafront avenue in Rimini, and asked for alternative modes transportation to be made available. A new coastal transportation system was officially presented in 1994, with the Emilia-Romagna region starting the process to obtain funds. The system had an approximate cost of ₤120,000,000,000 (today €92,000,000), The first track of 10 km of what was called the "metropolitana costiera" was ready by 1995. Further planning in 1995, regarding the advance of the project, promised that improvement works for such rapid transit would be started in 1997, terminated in 1999, and the first tickets being sold in 2000. A further financing from the Italian Committee of Economic Programmes came in 1996 for ₤62,000,000,000 (about €30,000,000).

However, works were continuously delayed and only began in 2011, as government funds received continuous delays over the years, despite being made available since 2006 and the required planning and expropriation procedures were already carried out. The works for the track, by Italiana Costruzioni, began in late 2012, and were completed in late 2017. In 2018, further works were carried out to install the overhead wires, construct the stops, test the automated control centre. START Romagna then proceeded to purchase 9 VanHool ExquiCity 18T bendy trolleybuses for the Metromare, after the USTIF denied the permission to use the six VanHool AG300T trolleybuses (fleet numbers 36501–36506) on this system.

The service of Metromare began on 23 November 2019. Due to a delay in the delivery of the VanHool Exquicity 18T trolleybuses  operating a six Iveco Urbanway 18m buses on loan from TPER Bologna, a couple of hybrid IIA Karsan Citymood 12m buses and other buses belonging to START Romagna.

Due to the COVID-19 pandemic in Italy, the service on the Metromare was suspended on 21 March 2020, and was eventually resumed as of 15 July 2020. The first VanHool Exquicity 18T was delivered to Rimini on 12 June 2020, and tests were carried out in November 2020.

Route

Today's Route

The current Metromare system runs on a 9.768 km long track entirely protected from the outside traffic, almost entirely parallel to the Bologna-Ancona railway. 60% of the track runs as a single lane, while the remaining 40% runs on a two-lane basis.

Future expansions

The municipality of Rimini approved in 2018 a 4.2 km extension of the Metromare system aiming to connect the areas of the Rimini Trade Fair and the town of Santarcangelo di Romagna to the current route. This new extension is planned to be operative as of 2025, with works beginning in late 2020, early 2021. Another extension has been planned between Riccione and Cattolica, but still has not been approved yet.

Controversies

The Metromare had been marred by various controversies and opinions against its construction by several local residents and politicians. In Riccione, the approval of the Metromare system in 2011, by then mayor Fabio Ubaldi, created a climate of disapproval among many local residents.

The 2014 local elections saw the appointment of centre-right coalition mayor Renata Tosi, a notorious critic of the Metromare (back then known as TRC). She considered the new transport system useless, as it ran parallel to the railway line; and campaigned for an improvement of the Rimini-Riccione trolleybus line, since the TRC would not be meeting the demand of local residents in term of transportation 

The general public also criticised the early opening of the system in 2019, since it included an extra expense of €1,000,000 to adapt the temporary buses for the system, as the nine VanHool ExquiCity 18T were still to be delivered and tests on their viability have only started in November 2020.

Fleet

9 Van Hool ExquiCity 18T (entered service October 2021)

The following vehicles were used on the Metromare initially, temporarily, before the nine trolleybuses had been certified for service:

4 Iveco Urbanway 18 Hybrid on loan from TPER Bologna (TPER fleet numbers 6400-6401-6402-6403)
4 IIA Citymood 12 CNG (START Romagna fleet numbers 32320, 32321, 32322 and 32323; nos. 32320 and 32321 have been returned to the Cesena Basin)
4 Neoplan N4522 Centroliner G (START Romagna fleet numbers 36041, 36043, 36044, 36045)

References

Bus rapid transit
Rimini
Transport in Emilia-Romagna
Rapid transit lines in Italy
Rimini
Rimini